Anne Osmundson (born February 7, 1957) is an American politician serving as a member of the Iowa House of Representatives from the 64th district. Elected in November 2018, she assumed office on January 14, 2019.

Early life and education 
Osmundson was born in McGregor, Iowa and raised in Volga, Iowa. She graduated from Central High School in Elkader, Iowa.

Career 
Osmundson served as secretary of the Clayton County Republican Party. She was also a member of the Clayton County Planning and Zoning Commission and Clayton County Judicial Magistrate Appointing Commission. Prior to her own election to the House, Osmundson served as a clerk to Representative Kristi Hager for two years. Osmundson was elected to the Iowa House of Representatives in November 2018 and assumed office on January 14, 2019. She serves as chair of the House Ethics Committee.

References 

1957 births
People from McGregor, Iowa
People from Clayton County, Iowa
Republican Party members of the Iowa House of Representatives
Women state legislators in Iowa
Living people
21st-century American women